Carter Henry Harrison Sr. (February 15, 1825October 28, 1893) was an American politician who served as mayor of Chicago, Illinois, from 1879 until 1887 and from 1893 until his assassination. He previously served two terms in the United States House of Representatives. Harrison was the first cousin twice removed of President William Henry Harrison, whose grandson, Benjamin Harrison, had also been president until just months prior to the assassination. He was also the father of Carter Harrison Jr., who would follow in his father's footsteps, and would serve five terms as the mayor of Chicago himself.

Early life, education, and career
Born on a plantation on February 15, 1825 near Lexington, Kentucky to Carter Henry Harrison II and Caroline Russell, he was only a few months old when his father died.

Harrison's family had a long Southern lineage, dating back to early colonial Virginia.

Harrison was educated by private tutors and graduated from Yale College in 1845 as a member of Scroll and Key. Following graduation, he traveled and studied in Europe from 1851 to 1853 before entering Transylvania College in Lexington, where he earned a law degree in 1855. Harrison was admitted to the bar in 1855 and commenced practice in Chicago. In 1855 he and his family came to Chicago because he saw it as a land of opportunity.  At the time, he inherited the Kentucky plantation and almost 100 slaves but sold out to be done with slavery.

Harrison invested in real estate in Chicago, and became a millionaire.

After the Great Chicago Fire, he became involved in politics. One of his first acts in politics was convincing Joseph Medill to run for mayor in 1871. Later, during Harrison's own career in citywide politics, Medill, publisher of the Chicago Tribune, would come to be a political rival of Harrison's.

Early political career
Harrison ran an unsuccessful campaign in 1872 for election to the 43rd United States Congress. From 1874 through 1876, he served one term as a member of the board of commissioners of Cook County.

Congressional career (1875–1879)
In 1874, Harrison was elected as a Democrat to the 44th United States Congress, and was subsequently reelected in 1876 to the 45th United States Congress.

Scandal occurred in his second term in congress when, as chairman of the Committee on Reform of the Civil Service, Harrison had pushed through the payment of benefits to four self-proclaimed Union Army veterans purporting disabilities from wartime injuries despite the fact that their claims had previously been rejected. None of these individuals had actually seen active service, and none of them had suffered serious injuries.

During his time in congress, he was noted for his flamboyant oration.

In 1878, Harrison lost reelection to congress.

First mayoralty (1879–1887)
During his first mayoralty, Harrison was elected mayor of Chicago for four consecutive two-year terms (in 1879, 1881, 1883, and 1885).

After he campaigned in 1879 with a pet eagle, he became affectionately nicknamed "the Eagle".

He was sworn-in for his first term on April 28, 1879.

During his first mayoralty, he surpassed his predecessor Monroe Heath's title as the longest serving mayor Chicago had had up to that time.

Leadership and popularity
Harrison has been described as a practitioner of charismatic authority. He governed the city in cooperation with a fractious Democratic Party organization.

While Harrison garnered both business and working class support, the evangelical middle class generally disapproved of Harrison.

Infrastructure and public safety
At the time he took office, Chicago had nearly a half-million residents. However, it was still a developing city. Harrison would later remark that, when he took office as mayor, "there were not ten miles of paved street in the whole city over which a light vehicle could move rapidly without injury to wheel or axle.” Long a booster of his adopted city, Harrison was known to refer to Chicago as his "bride". Harrison significantly increased the city's number of paved roads and sidewalks in its downtown and increased the size and improved the efficiency of its fire department. Harrison also forced utility companies operating in the central business district to bury their wires. Harrison fought the Illinois Central Railroad's right to the lakefront, a legal battle which was ultimately taken by the State of Illinois to Supreme Court of the United States in Illinois Central Railroad Co. v. Illinois. He also worked to persuade railroads to begin elevating their tracks to eliminate level crossings. He also attempted to push measures in the City Council that would have required locomotives, steamships and tugboats to burn anthracite, which burned cleaner. He also attempted to have the city build new and longer public water system intake pipes.

Haymarket affair
Harrison's first mayoral tenure was a period that saw many events which brought the city national and international attention. One such event was the Haymarket affair. Early on the evening of the Haymarket affair in 1886, Harrison had casually observed the then still peaceful demonstration of anarchists and trade unionists and advised the police to leave the demonstrators alone; he then left the scene before the "riot" occurred. A significant reason for his ability to attend the rally unbothered was that, while Harrison came from a Protestant background, he needed the votes of and thus made appeals to the city's large ethnic White Catholic population as well as its rapidly growing numbers of trade unionists. His administration gave the impression of being more favorable to trade unions and strikes than those of previous Chicago mayors as well as other mayors of the time, although his police force routinely viciously attacked striking workers and trade union activists - as the events of later that same evening were to prove once again.

Harrison was a delegate to the 1880 and 1884 Democratic National Conventions. At the 1884 convention, held in Chicago, Harrison supported the successful candidacy of Grover Cleveland, and delivered the seconding speech for Cleveland's nomination at the convention. Harrison was also alleged to have ordered the Chicago police to fill the convention hall's convention hall with as many men sympathetic to Cleveland's candidacy as they could find on the street.

1884 gubernatorial campaign
In 1884, Harrison ran as the Democratic Party nominee for governor of Illinois, losing to Republican Richard J. Oglesby.

End of tenure
Harrison's tenure as mayor formally ended on April 18, 1887.

Initial retirement from politics

Harrison retired from politics. He soon embarked on a sixteen-month world tour.

In 1890, Harrison and his daughter took a vacation trip from Chicago to Yellowstone National Park and Alaska. His letters from the trip were first published in the Chicago Tribune and later compiled into an 1891 book, A Summer's Outing and The Old Man's Story.

After leaving office, Harrison was owner and editor of the Chicago Times from 1891 to 1893, where he continued to advocate for labor unions and the many Catholic and immigrant communities in Chicago.

Harrison married Margarette (or Margaret) E. Stearns in 1882, following the death of his first wife in 1876. She was the daughter of Chicago pioneer Marcus C. Stearns.

Unsuccessful 1891 mayoral campaign
Harrison unsuccessfully sought to stage a comeback, running in the 1891 Chicago mayoral election.

Second mayoralty (1893)
Harrison was re-elected mayor in 1893, in time for the World's Columbian Exposition being held in the city. His desire was to show the world the "true" Chicago, and he appointed 1st Ward Alderman "Bathhouse" John Coughlin to sit on the reception committee. This appointment was a small part in Harrison's plan to create a centralized Democratic Party machine consisting of empowered ward committeemen and precinct captains that would answer to the local Democratic Party. The plan would not be accomplished until Anton Cermak came to power in Chicago politics in the 1920s.

Harrison was sworn-in for his fifth nonconsecutive term on April 17, 1893.

Assassination 

On October 28, 1893, a few months into his fifth term and just two days before the close of the World's Columbian Exposition, Harrison was murdered in his home by Patrick Eugene Prendergast, an office-seeker who had supported Harrison's re-election under the idea that Harrison would reward him with an appointment to a post within his mayoral administration. Harrison was buried in Chicago's Graceland Cemetery. As part of his funeral services, Harrison laid in state in the City Hall. A celebration planned for the close of the Exposition was cancelled and replaced by a large public memorial service for Harrison. Prendergast was sentenced to death for the crime and hanged on July 13, 1894.

While Harrison died at a time when the elites, Protestants, and Republicans of all kinds greatly disliked him, he never lost his core supporters of labor unions, Catholics, immigrants, and the working class. He was Chicago's first mayor to be elected five times; eventually his son Carter Harrison Jr. was also elected mayor five times.

Harrison's career and assassination are closely connected with the World's Columbian Exposition, and are discussed at some length as a subplot to the two main stories (about the fair and serial killer H. H. Holmes) in Erik Larson's best-selling 2003 non-fiction book The Devil in the White City.

Political positions
Harrison was a populist Democrat.

Harrison did not disapprove of liquor consumption or gambling.

Hailing from a border state and wed to a woman who hailed from the Deep South, during the American Civil War, Harrison had occasionally openly expressed sympathy towards the Confederate cause, leading him to be derided as a Copperhead.

Harrison saw the city's strength as being in its neighborhoods, and viewed it as a city of neighborhoods.

Personal life
In 1855, Harrison married his first wife, the former Sophie Preston. Together they had ten children, six of whom died at a young age. She died in Europe in 1876.

After being widowed, Harrison married Margarette (or Margaret) E. Stearns in 1882. He was widowed again when she died in 1887.

At the time of his assassination, Harrison was engaged to a young New Orleans heiress named Annie Howard, daughter of Louisiana State Lottery Company organizer Charles T. Howard, who was worth an estimated $3,000,000.

Legacy
The Carter H. Harrison Medal is one of two medals "granted to sworn members of the fire and police departments who have performed distinguished acts of bravery in the protection of life or property", the other being the Lambert Tree Award.

See also
 Samuel Gompers
 List of assassinated American politicians
 Casimir Zeglen

References

External links

 
 
 
 Carter Harrison III (1825–1893)

|-

|-

|-

1825 births
1893 deaths
1893 murders in the United States
19th-century American politicians
American people of English descent
Assassinated American politicians
Assassinated mayors
Burials at Graceland Cemetery (Chicago)
Carter family of Virginia
Deaths by firearm in Illinois
Democratic Party members of the United States House of Representatives from Illinois
Carter Sr.
Mayors of Chicago
Members of the Cook County Board of Commissioners
People murdered in Illinois
Male murder victims
Politicians from Lexington, Kentucky
Randolph family of Virginia
Transylvania University alumni
Yale University alumni
Copperheads (politics)
Assassinated American county and local politicians